Michael Showers (March 14, 1966 – August 22, 2011) was an American actor who was best known for his role as Captain John Guidry on the television series Treme.

Death
On August 24, 2011, Showers' body was discovered in the Mississippi River near the French Quarter of New Orleans, Louisiana. New Orleans police speculated that Showers had been dead for at least two days when his body was found. Autopsy results confirmed that Showers' death was caused by drowning.

Filmography

Film
 Traffic (2000) - Meeting Leader
 Immortally Yours (2007) - Jack Dougherty
 Mad Money (2008) - Detective (Uncredited)
 Soul Men (2008) - Detective in Charge
 I Love You Phillip Morris (2009) - Gary
 Wonderful World (2009) - Marty Rowe 
 The Collector (2009) - Deputy Sheriff
 Tekken (2009) - Security Assistant #1
 The Resident (2011) - August ER Doctor 
 The Tree of Life (2011) - Mr. Brown
 Love, Wedding, Marriage (2011) - Handsome Toothless Man
 Colombiana (2011) - Cop

Television
 Sordid Lives: The Series (2008) - Homeless Man (1 Episode)
 The Vampire Diaries (2010) - The Man (1 Episode)
 Breaking Bad (2010) - Union Rep (1 Episode)
 Treme (2011) - Captain John Guidry (4 Episodes)

References

External links
 

1966 births
2011 deaths
American male film actors
American male television actors
People from St. Bernard Parish, Louisiana
Deaths by drowning in the United States
Male actors from Louisiana
Accidental deaths in Louisiana
21st-century American male actors